Ezekiel 34 is the thirty-fourth chapter of the Book of Ezekiel in the Hebrew Bible or the Old Testament of the Christian Bible. This book contains the prophecies attributed to the prophet/priest Ezekiel, and is one of the Books of the Prophets. In this chapter, Ezekiel prophesies against the "irresponsible shepherds" of Israel and states that God will instead seek out God's sheep and become their "true shepherd".

Text
The original text was written in the Hebrew language. This chapter is divided into 31 verses.

Textual witnesses
Some early manuscripts containing the text of this chapter in Hebrew are of the Masoretic Text tradition, which includes the Codex Cairensis (895), the Petersburg Codex of the Prophets (916), Aleppo Codex (10th century), Codex Leningradensis (1008).

There is also a translation into Koine Greek known as the Septuagint, made in the last few centuries BC. Extant ancient manuscripts of the Septuagint version include Codex Vaticanus (B; B; 4th century), Codex Alexandrinus (A; A; 5th century) and Codex Marchalianus (Q; Q; 6th century).

Verse 2
 "Son of man, prophesy against the shepherds of Israel, prophesy and say to them,
 Thus says the Lord God to the shepherds:
 "Woe to the shepherds of Israel who feed themselves!
 Should not the shepherds feed the flocks?" (NKJV)
 "Son of man" (Hebrew: בן־אדם -): this phrase is used 93 times to address Ezekiel.
 "Shepherd" (Hebrew: רועי or רעי ): the noun is derived from the Hebrew verb רָעָה  (Assyrian rê°û, verb: "pasture", noun: "ruler") meaning to "pasture, tend, graze", to "feed (the flock)"; figuratively "to guard, care for, rule." A "common allegory" referring to the rulers of Israel, either political or spiritual.

Verse 3
You eat the fat and clothe yourselves with the wool; you slaughter the fatlings, but you do not feed the flock.
"You eat the milk" in the Septuagint - the consonants are the same.

Verse 5
 So they were scattered because there was no shepherd;
 and they became food for all the beasts of the field when they were scattered. (NKJV)
Cross reference: ; ; ; ; ; ; ; ;

Verse 6
My sheep wandered through all the mountains, and on every high hill; yes, My flock was scattered over the whole face of the earth, and no one was seeking or searching for them.”
The final words, "for them", are added in most English translations, as they are not in the original text. Robert Young's Literal Translation ends "and there is none inquiring, and none seeking". The sheep are scattered, "first on to 'every high hill' as idolaters, and then 'over the face of the earth' in exile".

Verse 16“I will seek what was lost and bring back what was driven away, bind up the broken and strengthen what was sick; but I will destroy the fat and the strong, and feed them in judgment.”This verse "clearly anticipates a return from exile to the land of Israel".

Verse 23
 I will establish one shepherd over them, and he shall feed them — My servant David. He shall feed them and be their shepherd. (NKJV)
Cross reference: ; ; ; ; ; ; ; ; ; 

Verse 25

 “I will make a covenant of peace with them, and cause wild beasts to cease from the land; and they will dwell safely in the wilderness and sleep in the woods.” (NKJV)
Cross reference: ; Hosea 2:20; Jeremiah 31:31

Verse 31
 “You are My flock, the flock of My pasture; you are men, and I am your God,” says the Lord God.'' (NKJV)

See also

David
Israel
Related Bible parts: 1 Samuel 5, 1 Samuel 7, Psalm 23, Psalm 78, Psalm 89, Isaiah 40, Jeremiah 31, Matthew 23, Matthew 25, Luke 15, John 10, John 21, Hebrews 8

Notes

References

Bibliography

External links

Jewish
Ezekiel 34 Hebrew with Parallel English
Ezekiel 34 Hebrew with Rashi's Commentary

Christian
Ezekiel 34 English Translation with Parallel Latin Vulgate

34